The Eastern Zone was one of the three regional zones of the 1974 Davis Cup.

11 teams entered the Eastern Zone, with 9 teams competing in the preliminary round to join the previous year's finalists Australia and India in the main draw. The winner of the main draw went on to compete in the Inter-Zonal Zone against the winners of the Americas Zone and Europe Zone.

India defeated Australia in the final and progressed to the Inter-Zonal Zone. With a total of 327 games, the Eastern Zone final set the Davis Cup record for the most games in a tie, still standing as of 2019.

Preliminary rounds

Draw

First round
Philippines vs. Indonesia

Japan vs. South Korea

Qualifying round
Pakistan vs. Malaysia

Philippines vs. Hong Kong

Japan vs. South Vietnam

Main Draw

Draw

Quarterfinals
Pakistan vs. Philippines

Chinese Taipei vs. Japan

Semifinals
Pakistan vs. Australia

India vs. Japan

Final

References

External links
Davis Cup official website

Davis Cup Asia/Oceania Zone
Eastern Zone
Davis Cup
Davis Cup
Davis Cup
Davis Cup